Hydroxypropanoic acid, or alternately hydroxypropionic acid, may refer to either of two isomeric chemical compounds:

3-Hydroxypropionic acid (hydracrylic acid)
Lactic acid (2-hydroxypropanoic acid)